902 Probitas is a minor planet orbiting the Sun. It was discovered  by an Austrian astronomer Johann Palisa in Vienna on 3 September 1918.

References

External links 
 
 

000902
Discoveries by Johann Palisa
Named minor planets
19180903